The Diocese of Bălți and Fălești is an eparchy or diocese of the Metropolis of Chișinău and All Moldova under the Moscow Patriarchate with its seat at the Cathedral of Sts. Constantine and Helena in Bălți, Moldova.

History
The Diocese of Bălți and Fălești was established on October 6, 2006, by the Holy Synod of the Russian Orthodox Church out of the territory of the Diocese of Chişinău. The Holy Synod elected Archimandrite Marchel (Mihăescu) as the first Bishop of Bălți and Fălești.

As of 2010 the Eparchy consisted of 104 parishes, 2 monasteries, and 3 sketes served by 129 full-time priests and 10 deacons.

External links
Eparchy of Bălți and Făleşti (Russian)
Eparchy of Bălți and Făleşti (Moldovan/Romanian)

Eparchies of the Russian Orthodox Church